Trévron (Gallo: Terveron) is a commune in the Côtes-d'Armor department in Brittany in northwestern France.

Population

Inhabitants of Trévron are called trévronnais in French.

See also
 Communes of the Côtes-d'Armor department

References

External links

 
 

Communes of Côtes-d'Armor